This is a list of Arkansas state high school golf championships sanctioned by the Arkansas Activities Association.

Listings include champions of the annual spring state golf championship tournament at each classification level based on size of school population.

Boys golf champions 
The following is a list of Arkansas state champions in boys golf:

 2017 – Fayetteville, Jonesboro, Little Rock Christian, Shiloh Christian, Harding Academy, Buffalo Island Central, Izard County
 2016 – Fayetteville, Jonesboro, Valley View, Shiloh Christian, Harding Academy, Buffalo Island Central, Concord
 2015 – Fayetteville, Jonesboro, Little Rock Christian, Baptist Prep, Melbourne, Buffalo Island Central, Concord
 2014 – Fayetteville, Jonesboro, HS Lakeside, Shiloh Christian, Fordyce, Spring Hill, Concord
 2013 – Fayetteville, Jonesboro, HS Lakeside, Arkansas Baptist, Harding Academy-Episcopal Collegiate, Buffalo Island Central, Ouachita
 2012 – Conway, Jonesboro, Harrison, Central Arkansas Christian, Episcopal Collegiate, Conway St. Joseph, Concord
 2011 – Conway, Jonesboro, HS Lakeside, Valley View, Episcopal Collegiate, Marked Tree, Izard County 
 2010 – Cabot, Jonesboro, HS Lakeside, Valley View, Arkansas Baptist, Conway St. Joseph, Izard County 
 2009 – Cabot, Benton, HS Lakeside, Fordyce, Episcopal Collegiate, Melbourne 
 2008 – Conway, Benton, Harrison, Ozark, Arkansas Baptist, Conway St. Joseph 
 2007 – Rogers, Mountain Home, Greenwood, Arkansas Baptist, Conway St. Joseph, Parkers Chapel 
 2006 – tie – LR Catholic-Conway, Mountain Home, HS Lakeside, Arkansas Baptist, Conway St. Joseph, Parkers Chapel 
 2005 – FS Southside, Batesville, Central Arkansas Christian, Arkansas Baptist 
 2004 – Fayetteville, Alma, Nashville, Jessieville 
 2003 – FS Southside, Arkadelphia, Pulaski Academy, Jessieville 
 2003 – Cabot, Greenwood, Pulaski Academy, LR Cathedral 
 2002 – Conway, Batesville, Beebe, Melbourne 
 2001 - Cabot, Siloam Springs, Pulaski Academy, Walnut Valley 
 2000 – Cabot, Siloam Springs, Pulaski Academy, FS Christian 
 1999 – Cabot, Hope, Bismarck, tie – Mammoth Spring-Parkers Chapel 
 1998 – Cabot, Hope, tie – Lonoke-McGehee, Manila 
 1997 – Cabot, Harrison, Central Arkansas Christian, Mammoth Spring 
 1996 – Jonesboro, Harrison, De Queen, Shiloh Christian 
 1995 – Jonesboro, Batesville, Pocahontas, Central Arkansas Christian 
 1994 – Blytheville, Searcy, Lonoke, Central Arkansas Christian 
 1993 – FS Southside, HS Lakeside, Pocahontas, Manila 
 1992 – Springdale, Magnolia, Fountain Lake 
 1991 – LR Catholic, Searcy, Pocahontas 
 1990 – LR Catholic, Searcy, Fountain Lake 
 1989 – LR Catholic, HS Lakeside, McCrory 
 1988 – Jonesboro, HS Lakeside, McGehee 
 1987 – El Dorado, HS Lakeside, Fountain Lake 
 1986 – Russellville, Searcy, Jefferson Prep 
 1985 – LR Catholic, Batesville, Jefferson Prep 
 1984 – Benton, Camden, De Queen 
 1983 – Pine Bluff, FS Southside, Searcy, Bald Knob 
 1982 – LR Central, Conway, Camden, Piggott 
 1981 – LR Central, Benton, Camden, Piggott 
 1980 – LR Central, Jonesboro, HS Lakeside, Pulaski Academy 

 1979 – NA 
 1978 – Conway, Camden
 1977 – FS Northside, HS Lakeside 
 1976 – LR Parkview, Russellville, Van Buren, Bald Knob 
 1975 – NLR Northeast, Blytheville, Camden, Manila 
 1974 – LR Parkview, FS Southside, Camden, De Queen 
 1973 – El Dorado, Forrest City, Camden, Manila 
 1972 – Pine Bluff, Hot Springs, Camden, Gosnell 
 1971 – FS Northside, Hot Springs, Searcy, Augusta 
 1970 – LR Central, Van Buren, Heber Springs 
 1969 – LR Hall, Forrest City, Heber Springs 
 1968 – El Dorado, Sylvan Hills, Crawfordsville 
 1967 – El Dorado, LR Catholic, Crawfordsville 
 1966 – El Dorado, Russellville, McGehee 
 1965 – North Little Rock, LR Catholic, Fordyce 
 1964 – LR Hall, LR Catholic, Fordyce 
 1963 – LR Hall, Fayetteville, Fordyce 
 1962 – Hot Springs, Fayetteville, Arkadelphia 
 1961 – Hot Springs, Fayetteville, Sacred Heart 
 1960 – Texarkana, Fayetteville, Dollarway 
 1959 – Texarkana, Benton, Dumas 
 1958 – Little Rock, Benton, Prescott 
 1957 – Texarkana, Hope 
 1956 – NA 
 1955 – Little Rock, Arkadelphia 
 1954 – Little Rock, Crossett 
 1953 – El Dorado, Monticello 
 1952 – El Dorado, Fayetteville 
 1951 – El Dorado, Fayetteville 
 1950 – El Dorado, Fayetteville 
 1949 – NA 
 1948 – Little Rock

Girls golf champions 
The following is a list of Arkansas state champions in girls golf:

2020 - Har-Ber, El Dorado, Brookland, Bismarck, Conway Christian, West Side Greers Ferry
 2019 - Bentonville, Hot Springs Lakeside, Brookland, Bismarck, Melbourne, West Side Greers Ferry
 2018 - Bentonville, Hot Springs Lakeside, Nashville, Bismarck, Melbourne, Lead Hill
 2017 – Bentonville, Greenwood, HS Lakeside, Arkansas Baptist, Melbourne, Cam Harmony Grove, Lead Hill
 2016 – Conway, Jonesboro, Little Rock Christian, Arkansas Baptist, Bismarck, Cam Harmony Grove, Lead Hill
 2015 – FS Southside, Jonesboro, Maumelle, Central Arkansas Christian, Booneville, Spring Hill, West Side GF
 2014 – Fort Smith Southside, Greenwood, HS Lakeside, Arkansas Baptist, Cam Harmony Grove, Spring Hill, West Side GF 
 2013 – Fayetteville, Marion, HS Lakeside, Valley View, Jessieville, Spring Hill, Shirley
 2012 – Conway, Greenwood, HS Lakeside, Valley View, Smackover, Spring Hill, Mt Vernon–Enola
 2011 – Fayetteville, Marion, HS Lakeside, Clarksville, Rivercrest, Eureka Springs, Shirley 
 2010 – Fayetteville, El Dorado, Greenwood, Heber Springs, Jessieville, Conway St. Joseph, West Side GF 
 2009 – Fayetteville, El Dorado, Greene County Tech, Heber Springs, Jessieville, Conway St. Joseph 
 2008 – Fayetteville, Benton, HS Lakeside, Pottsville, Arkansas Baptist, Conway St. Joseph 
 2007 – Fayetteville, El Dorado, Greenwood, Highland, Conway St. Joseph, Shirley 
 2006 – Fayetteville, Sheridan, Harrison, Clarksville, Conway St. Joseph, Melbourne 
 2005 – Fayetteville, Harrison, Clarksville, Melbourne 
 2004 – El Dorado, White Hall, Heber Springs, Conway St. Joseph 
 2003 – Fayetteville, Greenwood, Heber Springs, Shirley 
 2003 – Searcy, Greenwood, Ozark, Smackover 
 2002 – El Dorado, Vilonia, Ozark, Conway St. Joseph 
 2001 – Fayetteville, HS Lakeside, Highland, Ouachita 
 2000 – El Dorado, HS Lakeside, Highland, Conway St. Joseph 
 1999 – Mount St. Mary, HS Lakeside, Highland 
 1998 – Mount St. Mary, Searcy, Pulaski Academy 
 1997 – FS Southside, Huntsville 
 1996 – Jacksonville

 1995 – Jacksonville 
 1994 – Jacksonville 
 1993 – Cabot 
 1992 – Cabot 
 1991 – Cabot 
 1990 – Cabot 
 1989 – Cabot 
 1988 – Cabot 
 1987 – Cabot 
 1986 – Cabot 
 1985 – Fayetteville 
 1984 – Hope 
 1983 – Mount St. Mary 
 1982 – Greene County Tech 
 1981 – Sylvan Hills 
 1980 – Paragould 
 1979 – Sylvan Hills 
 1978 – Mount St. Mary 
 1977 – Fayetteville 
 1976 – Cabot 
 1975 – Fayetteville 
 1974 – NA 
 1973 – Fayetteville 
 1972 – HS Lakeside 
 1971 – HS Lakeside

See also 

 Arkansas Activities Association

References

External links 
 Arkansas Activities Association: Golf

Golf champions, List of Arkansas state
high school champions